Arthur M. Brazier (July 22, 1921 – October 22, 2010) was an American activist, author and pastor of the Apostolic Church of God in Chicago, Illinois. Brazier served as pastor of the Universal Church of Christ, before merging with ACOG. He was also a bishop, prominent civic leader and founder of The Woodlawn Organization, which was influential in Chicago's civil rights movement in the 1960s.

Career
Brazier was a preacher and real estate developer. He also marched alongside Martin Luther King Jr. to protest racial segregation. Among his activities was campaigning for the demolition of the Chicago "L" East 63rd branch east of the Cottage Grove station, claiming the portion of the line contributed to urban blight.

Retirement and death
On October 22, 2010, Brazier died at Northwestern Memorial Hospital in Chicago, after a five-year battle with prostate cancer.

References

External links
Apostolic Church of God home page

Antioch College alumni
American Christian religious leaders
1921 births
2010 deaths
Writers from Chicago